Nigricauda, a Latin word meaning black-tailed, may refer to:

 B. nigricauda
 Brycinus nigricauda, Thys van den Audenaerde, 1974, a ray-finned fish species in the genus Brycinus
 D. nigricauda
 Dasymutilla nigricauda, a wasp species in the genus Dasymutilla
 E. nigricauda
 Enneapterygius nigricauda, Fricke, 1997, the blacktail triplefin, a fish species in the genus Enneapterygius
 N. nigricauda
 Nephrotoma nigricauda, Alexander, 1925, a species in the genus ''Nephrotoma
 R. nigricauda
 Rineloricaria nigricauda, a freshwater tropical catfish species in the genus Rineloricaria

Subspecies
 Leucauge decorata nigricauda, Schenkel, 1944, a subspecies in the spider species Leucauge decorata and the genus Leucauge found in Timor
 a race of the white-rumped shama, a small passerine bird

See also
 Nigricaudus